The 1903 Campeonato Paulista, organized by the LPF (Liga Paulista de Football), was the 2nd season of São Paulo's top association football league. São Paulo Athletic won the title for the 2nd time. no teams were relegated and the top scorers were Paulistano's Álvaro Rocha and São Paulo Athletic's Herbert Boyes with 4 goals.

System
The championship was disputed in a double-round robin system, with the team with the most points winning the title.

Championship

Finals

References

Campeonato Paulista seasons
Paulista